Darband Cave is a Lower Paleolithic site in the Gilan Province in northern Iran, located on the north side of a deep tributary canyon of the Siahrud River, a tributary of the Sefīd-Rūd River that flows into the Caspian Sea.

The cave contains evidence for the earliest prehistoric human cave occupation during the Lower Paleolithic in Iran. Stone artifacts and animal fossils were discovered by a group of Iranian archaeologists of the Department of Paleolithic  of the National Museum of Iran and ICHTO of Gilan. The site dates back to the late Middle Pleistocene period.

The presence of large numbers of cave bear and brown bear remains and sparse stone artifacts at the site indicates that Darband primarily represents a bear den. The co-occurrence of artifacts and bear bones does not imply human predation or scavenging. Because there are no clear cut marks, except a few burning signs on the bear bones, they probably accumulated through natural processes

References

 
 
 
23

External links

 

Archaeological sites in Iran
Former populated places in Iran
History of Gilan
Landforms of Gilan Province
Caves of Iran
Lower Paleolithic
Prehistoric Iran